Nicholas Hugh Smith (born 1962) is an Australian philosopher and Professor of Philosophy at the Macquarie University.
Smith is known for his research on hermeneutics, political philosophy and Charles Taylor's thought.

Books
 Strong Hermeneutics: Contingency and Moral Identity, Routledge 1997, 
 Charles Taylor: Meaning, Morals and Modernity, Polity 2002, 
 Critique Today, edited with Jean-Philippe Deranty, Robert Sinnerbrink, and Peter Schmiedgen, Brill 2006
 New Philosophies of Labour: Work and the Social Bond, edited with Jean-Philippe Deranty, Brill 2011, 
 Recognition Theory as Social Research: Investigating the Dynamics of Social Conflict, co-edited with Shane O'Neill, Palgrave Macmillan 2012 
 Perspectives on the Philosophy of Charles Taylor, co-edited with Arto Laitinen, Helsinki, Acta Philosophica Fennica, vol. 71, 2002
 Reading McDowell: On Mind and World, Routledge 2002.

References

External links
 Nick Smith at Macquarie University

Australian philosophers
Continental philosophers
Philosophy academics
Living people
Academic staff of Macquarie University
1962 births
Hermeneutists
Critical theorists
Political philosophers
Social philosophers
Alumni of the University of Glasgow
Alumni of Newcastle University
Alumni of the University of York